The Railway Exchange Building is a historic building in Portland, Oregon, also known as the Oregon Pioneer Building. The structure houses the restaurant Huber's.

Description
The six-story reinforced concrete structure has exterior non-bearing walls, a basement with 3-foot brick and stone walls, and a composition roof.

History
The structure was built in 1910, marking Portland's first fully concrete building. It later became known as the Builders Exchange Building, then the Oregon Pioneer Building.

The building once housed the Oregon Liquor Control Commission. It has also housed the Peruvian and Venezuelan consulates.

The Railway Exchange Building and Huber's Restaurant were added to the National Register of Historic Places on March 13, 1979.

Marriott International's Autograph Collection debuted the Hi-Lo Hotel in the building in 2017.

See also

 National Register of Historic Places listings in South and Southwest Portland, Oregon

References

External links
 
 Oregon Pioneer Building at Emporis

1910 establishments in Oregon
Buildings and structures completed in 1910
Buildings and structures in Portland, Oregon
National Register of Historic Places in Portland, Oregon
Southwest Portland, Oregon